Kathleen Joan DeBold (November 16, 1955 - October 9, 2022) was an LGBT activist and advocate. The Washington Blade named her "Most Committed Female Activist" (2001) as well as a "Local Hero" (2005).

In 2015, DeBold was named a Community Pioneer by Washington D.C.'s Rainbow History Project. At that time, she was the national administrator for the Lambda Literary Awards, a position she had held since 2012. 

DeBold was an early advocate for the specific health needs of lesbian patients, people who might avoid regular checkups because of fear of discrimination or awkwardness about being "out" to their health care providers.  She was the executive director of the Mautner Project from 1999 through 2007. While at the Mautner Project she developed many GLBT-specific health programs including Delicious Lesbian Kisses, an anti-smoking campaign focused on lesbians. Prior to marriage equality in the United States, it was important that lesbians in long-term relationships understood their legal rights if their partner was seriously ill; DeBold, through her work with the Mautner Project for Lesbians with Cancer, advocated for lesbian-specific support groups for partners of people with cancer. She organized Healing Works, a national conference about lesbians and cancer in 2000 which focused on creating a "future agenda for lesbian cancer research and support services."

DeBold also spearheaded research including the Spirit Health Study, a national survey of black lesbian and bisexual women's health. She was also an interim Executive Director of the Servicemembers Legal Defense Network (SLDN) where she fought for the repeal of the Don’t Ask, Don’t Tell policy. Through her work as deputy director of the Gay & Lesbian Victory Fund, DeBold has been a campaigner for many LGBT candidates—D.C. Councilmembers David Catania and Jim Graham, U.S. senator Tammy Baldwin—and wrote a book Out for Office: Campaigning in the Gay Nineties. Her other book, Word Gaymes, is a compilation of crossword puzzles and acrostics she published in the Washington Blade and elsewhere.

Personal life
DeBold graduated from R.E. Peary High School in Rockville, Maryland, attended Flagler College in St. Augustine, Florida. She received a B.S. in Agriculture and Life Sciences from the University of Maryland and became Maryland's first female apiary inspector in 1978. She went to the Central African Republic as a Peace Corps volunteer, where she taught beekeeping and helped the people of the Central African Republic create honey and beeswax markets. She wrote about the experience for the journal Bee World in 1996. She was with her partner, author Barbara Johnson, since 1974. They lived in Burtonsville, Maryland.

References

External links
 Obituary

American beekeepers
1956 births
Living people
Flagler College alumni
University System of Maryland alumni
People from Rockville, Maryland
American LGBT writers
Writers from Maryland